The 2020-21 Merrimack Warriors Men's ice hockey season was the 66th season of play for the program, the 32nd at the Division I level, and the 32nd season in the Hockey East conference. The Warriors represented Merrimack College and were coached by Scott Borek, in his 3rd season.

Season
As a result of the ongoing COVID-19 pandemic the entire college ice hockey season was delayed. Because the NCAA had previously announced that all winter sports athletes would retain whatever eligibility they possessed through at least the following year, none of Merrimack's players would lose a season of play. However, the NCAA also approved a change in its transfer regulations that would allow players to transfer and play immediately rather than having to sit out a season, as the rules previously required.

Due to cancellations and rescheduling Merrimack began the season playing ranked teams in eight consecutive games. As a result, the team's record was a paltry 1–7. Despite the losses, the team was able to keep the score close in most games and used the experience to improve in the second half of the season. Merrimack ended the regular season on a 4–4–2 run, not a particularly stellar record, but a vast improvement over their start. The Warriors had risen to 9th in the conference and were getting ready to play Vermont on the final week of the regular season. Unfortunately, several members of the team entered COVID-19 protocols on March 4. As a result, not only was the Vermont series cancelled but, since the team could not feasibly receive a clean bill of health before the Hockey East Tournament began on March 10, Merrimack had to withdraw from postseason play and end their season.

James Corcoran and Jordan Seyfert sat out the season.

Departures

Recruiting

Roster
As of February 12, 2021.

Standings

Schedule and results

|-
!colspan=12 style=";" | Regular Season

|-
!colspan=12 style=";" | 
|- align="center" bgcolor="#e0e0e0"
|colspan=12|Participation Cancelled

Scoring statistics

Goaltending statistics

Rankings

USCHO did not release a poll in week 20.

Awards and honors

References

2020-21
2020–21 Hockey East men's ice hockey season
2020–21 NCAA Division I men's ice hockey by team
2020–21 in American ice hockey by team
2021 in sports in Massachusetts
2020 in sports in Massachusetts